Byers Lake is a small lake in Denali State Park, within the Matanuska-Susitna Borough, Alaska, United States,  north of Talkeetna. The lake is named for a fisherman who was brought there many times by bush pilot Don Sheldon in the 1950s. It is accessible from the George Parks Highway and has a developed campground, several public-use cabins and a small boat dock. The Alaska Veterans Memorial is on a hilltop adjacent to the lake. Gasoline-powered motors and floatplane landings are not permitted on the lake. The lake used to contain a sizable population of lake trout but due to overfishing in the time since the highway was built in 1972 the population has dwindled, and landings of lake trout are now rare, although there are still burbot in the lake as well. Migrating salmon also come into the lake but salmon fishing is not permitted. Campers are advised to keep a clean camp as the campground is frequently visited by bears. The lake is also home in summer months to trumpeter swans and common loons.

References

External links

Lakes of Alaska
Lakes of Matanuska-Susitna Borough, Alaska